Exhumed/Iron Reagan is a split EP released in 2014 by San Jose, California death metal band Exhumed and Richmond, Virginia crossover thrash band Iron Reagan.

Track listing

Personnel
Exhumed
 Rob Babcock − bass guitar, vocals
 Bud Burke − guitar, vocals
 Matt Harvey − guitar, vocals
 Mike Hamilton − drums

Iron Reagan
Tony Foresta – vocals
Mark Bronzino – guitar
Phil Hall – guitar
Rob Skotis – bass guitar
Ryan Parrish – drums

Production
Produced by Ryan Butler, Bob Quirk
Mixed by Ryan Butler, Rob Caldwell
Mastered by Ryan Butler, Dan Randall
Artwork by Jim Callahan

References

External links
Official website

2014 EPs
Exhumed (band) albums
Iron Reagan albums